Iracemápolis is a municipality in the state of São Paulo in Brazil. The population is 24,614 (2020 est.) in an area of 115.1 km². The elevation is 608 m.

It is known as the birthplace of footballer Elano.

References

Municipalities in São Paulo (state)